The Hastings Caves State Reserve is the setting of a complex of caves and a natural warm springs located  south of Hobart, Tasmania, Australia. Newdegate Cave, the largest dolomite cave in Australia open to tourists, is a part of the complex.

This feeds a swimming pool at the Hastings Visitor Centre, which is available to visitors to swim in.

The Hastings Visitor Centre was built in 2001 by Tasmanian Parks and Wildlife. Offering information, ticket sales, food and drink, souvenirs and free public WiFi. The Centre is a hub for the growing number of tourists that visit the Far South of Tasmania.

History 
The caves were discovered in 1917 by timber workers cutting trees near the entrance of the cave. The caves were initially opened up to tourists in the 1920s, and later the state government stepped in and took control during the Great Depression. Steps and a road to the cave were completed as part of depression era construction work to spur the economy, and the cave was officially opened by Albert Ogilvie, Premier of Tasmania, in 1939.

Newdegate Cave was named after Francis Newdegate, the Governor of Tasmania between 1917 and 1920.

Gallery

See also

 List of caves in Tasmania

References

External links 
discovertasmania.com
Tasmania Parks and Wildlife Service - Hastings Caves State Reserve

Show caves in Australia
Tourist attractions in Tasmania
Southern Tasmania
Nature reserves in Tasmania
Caves of Tasmania
Warm springs of Australia